is a city located in the western portion of Tokyo, Japan. , the city had an estimated population of 123,698 in 61,832 households. The total area of the city is  so the population density is about 11,000 persons per km².

Geography
Koganei approximately at the center of Tokyo metropolis, and is located about 20 kilometers west of Shinjuku, where Tokyo Metropolitan Government has its headquarters. It is flanked on the north and the south by two large parks. To the north is Koganei Park, which includes the Edo-Tokyo Open Air Architectural Museum, a branch of the Edo-Tokyo Museum located in Ryōgoku, Tokyo. To the south is Nogawa Park and Tama Cemetery. The city has an elevation of between 40 and 70 meters above sea level.

Surrounding municipalities
Chōfu
Mitaka
Musashino
Fuchū
Kokubunji
Kodaira
Nishitokyo

Climate
Koganei has a Humid subtropical climate (Köppen Cfa) characterized by warm summers and cool winters with light to no snowfall.  The average annual temperature in Koganei is 14.0 °C. The average annual rainfall is 1647 mm with September as the wettest month. The temperatures are highest on average in August, at around 25.5 °C, and lowest in January, at around 2.6 °C.

Demographics
Per Japanese census data, the population of Musashino Koganei grew rapidly in the 1950s and 1960s, but has remained relatively constant for the past 40 years.

History
The area of present-day Koganei was part of ancient Musashi Province. In the post-Meiji Restoration cadastral reform of July 22, 1878, the area became part of Kitatama District in Kanagawa Prefecture. The village of Koganei was created on April 1, 1889 with the establishment of the modern municipalities system. Kitatama District was transferred to the administrative control of Tokyo Metropolis on April 1, 1893. Koganei was elevated to town status in 1937, and to city status in 1958.

Government
Koganei has a mayor-council form of government with a directly elected mayor and a unicameral city council of 24 members. Koganei contributes one member to the Tokyo Metropolitan Assembly. In terms of national politics, the city is part of Tokyo 18th district of the lower house of the Diet of Japan.

Economy
Koganei is largely a bedroom community for central Tokyo. Gainax, Studio Ghibli and KOGANEI have their corporate headquarters in Koganei.

Industry

Agriculture 
Major products are tomatoes, eggplants, roots, udo (plant related to ginseng, used in medicine and cooking), and rhubarbs.

Enterprises 

 M.S.C Inc.
 Gaina Co.,Ltd.
 SynergySP Co.,Ltd.
 STUDIO GHIBLI INC.
 ZEXCS Inc.
 Twilight Studio inc.
 feel. inc.
 KOGANEI Corporation

Education

Universities
 Hosei University - Koganei campus
 Tokyo University of Agriculture and Technology - Koganei campus
 Tokyo Gakugei University
 International Christian University (officially located in Mitaka, lies partially within Koganei).

High schools
Tokyo Metropolitan Government Board of Education operates the following public high schools.
 
 
 

The following private high schools are also located in Koganei.
 
 International Christian University High School

Junior high and elementary schools
The Koganei Municipal Board of Education operates six public junior high schools and nine public elementary schools.

Public junior high schools include:
 Higashi (東中学校)
 Koganei No. 1 (小金井第一中学校)
 Koganei No. 2 (小金井第二中学校)
 Midori (緑中学校)
 Minami (南中学校)

Public elementary schools include:
 Higashi (東小学校)
 Honcho (本町小学校)
 Koganei No. 1 (小金井第一小学校)
 Koganei No. 2 (小金井第二小学校)
 Koganei No. 3 (小金井第三小学校)
 Koganei No. 4 (小金井第四小学校)
 Maehara (前原小学校)
 Midori (緑小学校)
 Minami (南小学校)

There is one private junior high school and one private elementary school.

Transport

Railway
 JR East –  Chūō Main Line
 - 
 - Seibu Railway - Seibu Tamagawa Line

Highway
Koganei is not served by any national highways or expressways

References

External links

Koganei City Official Website 

 
Cities in Tokyo
Western Tokyo